The Jacksonville State Gamecocks college football team represents Jacksonville State University as a member of Conference USA (C-USA). The Gamecocks competes as part of the NCAA Division I Football Bowl Subdivision. The program has had 26 head coaches, and two interim head coaches since it began play during the 1904 season. Since November 2021, Rich Rodriguez has served as head coach at Jacksonville State.

Since 1904, eight coaches have led Jacksonville State in postseason appearances: Don Salls, Jim Blevins, Charley Pell, Jim Fuller, Bill Burgess, Jack Crowe, Bill Clark, and John Grass. Nine of those coaches also won conference championships: Salls captured three as a member of the Alabama Intercollegiate Conference; Salls captured four and Blevins two as a member of the Alabama Collegiate Conference; Pell captured one as a member of the Mid-South Athletic Conference; Clarkie Mayfield captured one, Fuller four, Burgess four as a member of the Gulf South Conference; Crowe captured two and Grass six as a member of the Ohio Valley Conference; and Rodriguez one as a member of the ASUN Conference. The Gamecocks also won a national championship under Burgess in 1992 (D-II).

Salls is the leader in seasons coached and games won, with 95 victories during his 18 years with the program. Rodriguez has the highest winning percentage with .818, and F. A. Harwood has the lowest winning percentage with .000.

Key

Coaches

Notes

References 

Jacksonville State

Jacksonville State Gamecocks football coaches